Pish Kenar (also Romanized as Pīsh Kenār and Pishkanar) is a village in Eslamabad Rural District, Sangar District, Rasht County, Gilan Province, Iran. At the 2006 census, its population was 1,088, in 297 families.

References 

Populated places in Rasht County